Unión Deportiva San Sebastián de los Reyes B is a Spanish football team based in San Sebastián de los Reyes, in the Community of Madrid. The reserve team of UD San Sebastián de los Reyes, they play in Preferente de Madrid – Group 1, holding home matches at Polideportivo Municipal Rafael Delgado Rosa.

Season to season

Notable players
 Neyder Lozano

See also
UD San Sebastián de los Reyes

References

External links
 
La Preferente team profile 

Football clubs in the Community of Madrid
Spanish reserve football teams